is a Japanese former football player. She played for the Japan national team. She used her name "大竹 奈美" until 2009. Her husband is the former footballer Kento Tsurumaki.

Club career
Otake was born in Machida on July 30, 1974. In 1989, she joined Yomiuri Beleza (later Nippon TV Beleza). She was selected for the Young Player Awards in 1989. The club won the L.League championship for four years in a row (1990-1993). She was selected Best Eleven twice (1997 and 1999). She retired in July 2001.

National team career
On August 20, 1994, Otake debuted and scored a goal for the Japan national team against Slovakia. She also played at the 1994 and 1998 Asian Games, and the 1995, 1997 and 1999 AFC Championship. She was also in the Japanese squad for the 1995 and 1999 World Cups and the 1996 Summer Olympics. She played 46 games and scored 29 goals for Japan up to 1999.

Personal life
In July 2009, she changed her name from "大竹 奈美" to "大竹 七未". She married the footballer Kento Tsurumaki in June 2012.

National team statistics

International goals

References

External links
 

http://www.alamy.com/stock-photo-nami-otake-beleza-march-27-1994-football-soccer-15th-all-japan-womens-40410180.html
http://www.gettyimages.com/detail/news-photo/nami-otake-of-team-japan-controls-the-ball-as-tisha-news-photo/72362978#may-1999-nami-otake-of-team-japan-controls-the-ball-as-tisha-of-team-picture-id72362978

1974 births
Living people
Association football people from Tokyo
Japanese women's footballers
Japan women's international footballers
Nadeshiko League players
Nippon TV Tokyo Verdy Beleza players
1995 FIFA Women's World Cup players
Olympic footballers of Japan
Footballers at the 1996 Summer Olympics
Asian Games medalists in football
Footballers at the 1998 Asian Games
Footballers at the 1994 Asian Games
Women's association football midfielders
Asian Games silver medalists for Japan
Asian Games bronze medalists for Japan
Medalists at the 1994 Asian Games
Medalists at the 1998 Asian Games
1999 FIFA Women's World Cup players